Prisoner is the sixteenth studio album by American singer-songwriter Ryan Adams. It was released on February 17, 2017. The album is Adams' first album of original material since his 2014 album, Ryan Adams, and was preceded by the singles "Do You Still Love Me?", "To Be Without You", and "Doomsday".

Critical reception

Prisoner received generally positive reviews from music critics. At Metacritic, which assigns a normalized rating out of 100 to reviews from mainstream critics, the album has an average score of 79 based on 30 reviews, indicating "generally favorable reviews."

Stephen Thomas Erlewine of AllMusic rated the album four out of five stars, calling it "charming", and said that "it's not a record that wallows in hurt, it's an album that functions as balm for bad times." Writing for Slant Magazine, Jeremy Winograd rated the album four of five stars and said that Prisoner is "one of Adams's most sonically artful albums to date."

Accolades

Commercial performance
Prisoner debuted at number eight on the US Billboard 200 with 45,000 album-equivalent units, 42,000 of which were pure album sales.

Track listing

Personnel
Credits adapted from AllMusic.

 Ryan Adams – guitar, bass guitar, lead vocals, synthesizer, piano, harmonica, cover painting, photography, producer
 Johnny T. Yerington – drums, percussion, photography
 Charlie Stavish – bass guitar (1, 11, 12), engineer, mixing
 Mike Viola – guitar (1)
 Daniel Clarke – organ (1)
 Jason Boesel – drums (1)
 Joe Sublett – saxophone (11)
Technical
 Noah Abrams – photography
 Beatriz Artola – engineer, mixing
 Reuben Cohen – mastering
 Rachel Jones – assistant engineer
 Phil Joy – engineer
 Lee Foster – assistant engineer
 Gavin Lurssen – mastering
 Scott Newton – photography
 Andy West – design

Charts

Weekly charts

Year-end charts

Release history

References

2017 albums
Ryan Adams albums
PAX AM albums